Makasar is a Unicode block containing characters for Makasar script (also known as "Old Makassarese" or "Makassarese bird script" in English-language scholarly works).
The script was used historically in South Sulawesi, Indonesia for writing the Makassarese language.

Block

History
The following Unicode-related documents record the purpose and process of defining specific characters in the Makasar block:

References 

Unicode blocks